The Griddy is a dance move in which a person alternatingly taps their heels, either in place or while walking, while swinging their arms back and forth. Created by high school footballer Allen Davis in 2018, his dance went viral on TikTok in 2021. Minnesota Vikings wide receiver Justin Jefferson instructs “throw[ing] your B’s”. This looks similar to forming "ok" symbols around their eyes.

Etymology 
The name comes from the nickname of the creator of the dance, Allen "Griddy" Davis.

Origins 
Allen Davis, as a high school football player, was inspired by the Nae Nae to make his own dance. Davis created The Griddy and uploaded videos to YouTube showing it off. He introduced the dance to one of his best friends and teammate, future Cincinnati Bengals wide receiver Ja'Marr Chase. When Chase began playing football for LSU he showed it to fellow wide receiver Justin Jefferson.

Popularity 
After performing The Griddy at collegiate level games, Chase and Jefferson brought the dance to the NFL, bringing it popularity among players, celebrities, and fans. In 2020, a song titled "Right Foot Creep" by YoungBoy Never Broke Again was released, and it was synced up with the dance and used on TikTok. In 2021, the dance was featured as an emote in Fortnite.

During the 2022 Pro Bowl, New England Patriots quarterback Mac Jones did The Griddy after a “just for fun” 80 yard rushing touchdown that did not count, marking what many consider to be the final Pro Bowl highlight following the league’s ending of the Pro Bowl game. In 2022, a collaboration between Cinnamon Toast Crunch and Jefferson led to the release of Griddy Toast Crunch, a limited edition run of Cinnamon Toast Crunch cereal, including Jefferson’s likeness on the box. The boxes were priced for $50, selling out in 90 minutes. In 2022, American soccer player Christian Pulisic did The Griddy after scoring in the 2022 UEFA Champions League for Chelsea, which later became a celebration in FIFA 23. Jessie Lingard celebrated scoring for Nottingham Forest against Tottenham Hotspur on 9 November 2022. 1, 2023, Green Bay Packers cornerback Jaire Alexander did the Griddy in front of Justin Jefferson after breaking up a pass intended for the Vikings wide receiver.

References 

Dance moves
Internet memes introduced in 2022